Taha Karaan (2 June 1969 – 11 June 2021) was a South African Muslim scholar and jurist. He was the head-mufti of the Muslim Judicial Council, South Africa. He was the founder of Mahajjah Research Institute and the Dar al-Uloom al-Arabiyyah al-Islamiyyah in Strand.

Biography
Taha Karaan was born on 2 June 1969, in Cape Town. He was the son of Yusuf Karaan. He memorized the Quran at Waterfall Islamic Institute (Mia's Farm) and went to study at the Darul Uloom Deoband from where he graduated in 1991 with highest grades. He later studied for two years at the Cairo University. His teachers include Saeed Ahmad Palanpuri. Taha followed the Shafiʽi school but held close to the Hanafis and attributed himself to the Deobandism.

Taha was seen as an influential thinker in South Africa. He was honored with the title "ash-Shāfi‘ī as–Sagīr" (The Junior Al-Shafi'i) by Khalil Ibrahim Mula Khatir. In 1996, Taha established Dar al-Uloom al-Arabiyyah al-Islamiyyah (DUAI) in Strand. Under his supervision, the female wing of the DUAI was initiated in 2016 where Taha also served as a course advisor. Taha succeeded his father Yusuf Karaan as the head-mufti of Muslim Judicial Council in 2015. He was the founder and director of Mahajjah Research Institute that he had started in defense of the Companions of the Prophet. He was known throughout South Africa for debating Shia's. In early 90s, Azam Tariq regarded Taha Karaan's expertise in refuting the Shia's extraordinary. He wrote Fleeing from Fate to Fate: 40 Ahadith on Contagion and Pandemics.

He died on 11 June 2021, from COVID-19 complications. Islamic scholars and intellectuals Abdur Rahman ibn Yusuf Mangera, Faraz Rabbani, Ismail ibn Musa Menk, Omar Suleiman and Yasir Qadhi expressed grief over his death.

References

External links
 FNB sharia banking credentials questioned as board quits
 The Loss of A Giant, The Western world has lost one of its major scholars

1969 births
2021 deaths
People from Cape Town
Darul Uloom Deoband alumni
Cairo University alumni
South African Sunni Muslim scholars of Islam
Deobandis
Shafi'is
Deaths from the COVID-19 pandemic in South Africa